Veneroso is a surname and may refer to:
Ángel Moreno (baseball) (Ángel Veneroso Moreno; born 1955), Mexican baseball player
Dr. Frank Veneroso, 1938 president of the Hazleton Redskins
George Veneroso (1909–1996), American football player and coach
Gerolamo Veneroso (1660–1739), 148th Doge of Genoa and king of Corsica
Gian Giacomo Veneroso (1701–1758), 163rd Doge of Genoa